Hypselobarbus tamiraparaniei is a species of cyprinid in the genus Hypselobarbus. It inhabits India.

References

Cyprinidae
Cyprinid fish of Asia
Fish of India
Fish described in 2014